Events in the year 1820 in Brazil.

Incumbents
 Monarch – King John VI of Portugal

Events
 After the Liberal Revolution of 1820, the Portuguese court returns from Brazil to Portugal.

Births

Deaths

References

 
1820s in Brazil
Years of the 19th century in Brazil
Brazil
Brazil